Terningmoen is a military camp (or base) in Elverum in Norway.

The base trains and houses parts of the Norwegian Army such as:
 His Majesty the Kings's Guard (HMKG) (First two months of service)
 Norwegian Home Guard HV-05 (district 5 of the Home Guard)
 Norwegian Military Academy (The first year)
 Some TRADOK-units (Norwegian army transformation - and doctrine commando)
 Forsvarets Logistikkorganisasjon (FLO) (Logistics and support)

The base is also the location of a guard company "Vakt og Sikring Kompani Østerdalen", which has the responsibility of the protection of the camp.

The base trains soldiers (both Norwegian and NATO allies) in the Norwegian Army's Winter School, which trains soldiers in the harsh environments of winter in colder countries.

The base has shooting ranges, and large training areas which is used by many army units.

References

Norwegian Army bases
Elverum
Military installations in Innlandet